The 1935 NFL Championship game was the third National Football League (NFL) title game, held December 15 at University of Detroit Stadium (Titan Stadium) in Detroit, Michigan. The 1935 champion of the Western Division was the Detroit Lions (7–3–2) and the champion of the Eastern Division was the New York Giants (9–3).

The Giants, coached by Steve Owen, were in their third straight title game and were defending champions, while the Lions (coached by George "Potsy" Clark) were in their first title game, three years removed from their nailbiting loss in the indoor 1932 NFL Playoff Game as the Portsmouth Spartans.

At 15,000 attendance, it was the least attended peacetime championship game in league history.

Game summary
The weather in Detroit for the game was gray, wet, and windy, and the field at the University of Detroit's Titan Stadium was sloppy. The Lions took the opening kickoff and drove down the field for a touchdown. They were helped by two long passing plays, including one from Ace Gutowsky that hit Ed Danowski, playing defense, in the chest and was caught by end Ed Klewicki. Gutowsky capped the 61-yard drive with a two-yard touchdown run and Glenn Presnell kicked the extra point for the 7-0 lead. After the Lions scored another touchdown on a twisting 40 yard run by Dutch Clark, Detroit had a 13-0 lead, but the Giants cut the lead to 6 by halftime on a long pass from Danowski to Ken Strong. However, two touchdowns in the fourth quarter by Ernie Caddel and future Lions coach Buddy Parker sealed the 26-7 victory, and their first NFL Championship, for the Lions.

Scoring summary
Sunday, December 15, 1935
Kickoff: 2 p.m. EST

First quarter
DET – Ace Gutowsky 2-yard run (Glenn Presnell kick) 7–0 DET
DET – Dutch Clark 40-yard run (kick failed) 13–0 DET
Second quarter
NYG – Ken Strong 42-yard pass from Ed Danowski (Strong kick) 13–7 DET
Third quarter
no scoring
Fourth quarter
DET – Ernie Caddel 4-yard run (Clark kick) 20–7 DET
DET – Buddy Parker 4-yard run (kick failed) 26–7 DET

Officials
Referee: Tommy Hughitt
Umpire: Bobby Cahn
Head Linesman: Maurice J. Meyer
Field Judge: Harry Robb

Legacy
When asked about the game over 70 years later, Glenn Presnell (who was also the last surviving member of the Detroit Lions inaugural 1934 team) said this about the game: "I remember that it was a snowy day, very cold, and there were far less fans there than the ’34 Thanksgiving Day game. In those days, people didn’t go very often when it wasn’t nice weather.

"I was the starting quarterback that game and for most of the season. Potsy liked to start me and see what was going on before sending in Dutch Clark. The one thing that stands out to me is that we scored in the first two minutes. I had thrown a flat pass to our blocking back on a fake for a 60-yard play to about their four-yard line. Ace Gutowsky punched it over for the score and I kicked the extra point. If we celebrated when we made a touchdown like the way they do today we would have been hooted off the field.

"For winning the championship, we each received $300. We never got a championship ring like they do now, but it was certainly one of my proudest moments. Remember, professional football was not nearly as popular as college football and baseball. It was much more exciting to play college football at Nebraska in front of 40,000 people. It was a way to make a living during the Depression."

Detroit: "City of Champions"
When the Lions won the 1935 NFL Championship, the city of Detroit was mired in the Great Depression, which had hit Detroit and its industries particularly hard. But with the success of the Lions and other Detroit teams and athletes in 1935–1936, their luck appeared to be changing, as the city was dubbed the "City of Champions." The Detroit Tigers started the winning streak by capturing the 1935 World Series. The Lions continued the streak by winning the 1935 NFL Championship. They were followed by the Detroit Red Wings winning the 1935–36 Stanley Cup. With the Stanley Cup win on April 11, 1936, Detroit reigned as triple major league champions for nearly six months, until the Yankees clinched the 1936 World Series on October 6. No city has ruled as champions of three major sports simultaneously since.

But the Tigers, Lions and Wings were not the Motor City's only champions: Detroit's "Brown Bomber," Joe Louis, was the heavyweight boxing titlist; Detroiter Gar Wood, the first man to go 100 miles per hour on water, reigned as the world's top unlimited powerboat racer; and black Detroiter Eddie "the Midnight Express" Tolan had won gold medals in the 100- and 200-meter races at the 1932 Summer Olympics.

References

External links
blog.detroitathletic.com 

Detroit Lions postseason
1935 NFL Championship Game
New York Giants postseason
Championship Game
NFL Championship Game
NFL Championship Game
NFL Championship Game
American football competitions in Detroit